Amazonius burgessi is a tarantula in the Amazonius genus, it was first described by Martin Hüsser in 2018. It is found in Leticia, Colombia and Iquitos, Peru, although it is likely also found in Ecuador. It is named after Joseph Burges whom helped to collect important material for this study. It is fairly commonly breed and kept in captivity, with its common name being Ghost Tree Spider. As the name suggest it is an arboreal tarantula, and usually have a skittish behavior.

Description 
The described specimens were offspring raised in captivity of a wild caught specimen that were collected from a burrow and preserved in 80% ethanol. They have a faded brown, black or grey color, and long light hairs being orange or red in the abdomen.

Habitat 
This spider is found in Colombia, Peru and likely Ecuador, in lowland rainforests of the Amazon. With average temperatures 25–26 °C, the average yearly rainfall being 2900mm, being roughly around 100m above sea level.

References 

Spiders of South America
Theraphosidae
Spiders described in 2018